Bethesda, North Carolina may refer to:

Bethesda, Davidson County, North Carolina
Bethesda, Durham County, North Carolina